Diviciacus or Divitiacus was a king of the Belgic nation of the Suessiones in the early 1st century BC. Julius Caesar, writing in the mid-1st century BC, says that he had within living memory been the most powerful king in Gaul, ruling a large portion not only of Gallia Belgica, but also of Britain.

Since it is likely that Diviciacus spent at least a part of his life in Britain, he is possibly the earliest inhabitant of the British Isles found in Roman records.

References

Celtic warriors
Gaulish rulers
Briton rulers
1st-century BC rulers in Europe